Henry Otto Wix (1866–1922), also known as Otto Wix, was a German-born landscape and portrait painter who emigrated to the United States in the late 1890s.  He studied in New York, but visited Hawaii in 1907 and 1908–9.  About 1910, he moved to San Francisco, but visited Hawaii again in 1912.  He also made several sketching trips to Mexico.  Wix's marriage ended in divorce, resulting in depression and alcoholism. He died by his own hand in Santa Barbara, California on March 13, 1922.

Wix is best known for his landscapes in watercolor.  The Honolulu Museum of Art and the Smithsonian American Art Museum are among the public collections holding paintings by Henry Otto Wix.

References

Sources
 Hughes, Edan, Artists in California 1786-1940, Sacramento, Crocker Art Museum, 2002.
 Severson, Don R. Finding Paradise: Island Art in Private Collections, University of Hawaii Press, 2002, p. 104, 108–9.

External links
 Henry Otto Wix in AskArt.com
 Smithsonian American Art Museum, Art Inventories Catalog

1866 births
1922 deaths
Artists from Hawaii
19th-century American painters
American male painters
20th-century American painters
Painters from California
19th-century German painters
19th-century American male artists
German male painters
20th-century German painters
20th-century American male artists
German expatriates in the United States